Malpighia is a genus of flowering plants in the nance family, Malpighiaceae. It contains about 45 species of shrubs or small trees, all of which are native to the American tropics. The generic name honours Marcello Malpighi, a 17th-century Italian physician and botanist. The flowers are solitary or in umbels of two to several together, each flower  diameter, with five white, pink, red, or purple petals. The fruit is a red, orange, or purple drupe, containing two or three hard seeds. M. emarginata is cultivated for its sweet and juicy fruits, which are very rich in vitamin C.

Selected species
 Malpighia aquifolia L.
 Malpighia cauliflora Proctor & Vivaldi (Jamaica)
 Malpighia coccigera L. – Singapore holly (Caribbean)
 Malpighia cubensis Kunth – palo bronco de hoja pequeña (Cuba)
 Malpighia emarginata DC. – Barbados cherry, acerola (southern Texas and Florida, Mexico, Central America, the Caribbean, northern South America.)
 Malpighia fucata Ker Gawl. (Puerto Rico)
 Malpighia glabra
 Malpighia harrisii Small (Jamaica)
 Malpighia mexicana A.Juss.
 Malpighia obtusifolia Proctor (Jamaica)
 Malpighia polytricha A.Juss.
 Malpighia proctorii Vivaldi (Jamaica)
 Malpighia setosa Spreng. – bristly stingingbush (The Bahamas, Hispaniola, Puerto Rico)
 Malpighia suberosa Small
 Malpighia urens L. – cowhage (Caribbean)

Formerly placed here
 Bunchosia argentea (Jacq.) DC. (as M. argentea Jacq.)
 Bunchosia armeniaca (Cav.) DC. (as M. armeniaca Cav.
 Bunchosia glandulifera (Jacq.) Kunth (as M. glandulifera Jacq.)
 Bunchosia glandulosa (Cav.) DC. (as M. glandulosa Cav.)
 Byrsonima altissima (Aubl.) DC. (as M. altissima Aubl.)
 Byrsonima crassifolia (L.) Kunth (as M. crassifolia L.)
 Byrsonima densa (Poir.) DC. (as M. densa Poir.)
 Byrsonima spicata  (Cav.) DC. (as M. spicata Cav.)
 Heteropterys multiflora (DC.) Hochr. (as M. reticulata Poir.)

References

 
Malpighiaceae genera